FHB may refer to:
 Fédération Haïtienne de Basket-Ball, the Haitian Basketball Federation
 Fernandina Beach Municipal Airport, in Florida, United States
 FHB Mortgage Bank, a Hungarian bank
 First Hawaiian Bank, an American bank
 Flexor hallucis brevis muscle
 Food and Health Bureau, in Hong Kong
 Fusarium head blight